The 2022 Northern Ontario Men's Provincial Curling Championship, the men's provincial curling championship for Northern Ontario, was held from February 10 to 13 at the Community First Curling Centre in Sault Ste. Marie, Ontario. The winning Brad Jacobs team represented Northern Ontario at the 2022 Tim Hortons Brier, Canada's national men's curling championship in Lethbridge, Alberta.

Teams
The teams are listed as follows:

Round-robin standings
Final round-robin standings

Round-robin results
All draws are listed in Eastern Time (UTC−05:00).

Draw 1
Thursday, February 10, 2:00 pm

Draw 2
Friday, February 11, 9:00 am

Draw 3
Friday, February 11, 2:00 pm

Draw 4
Saturday, February 12, 9:00 am

Draw 5
Saturday, February 12, 2:00 pm

Playoffs

Final
Sunday, February 13, 10:00 am

References

External links

2022 Tim Hortons Brier
Sport in Sault Ste. Marie, Ontario
Curling in Northern Ontario
2022 in Ontario
February 2022 sports events in Canada
Curling competitions in Ontario